Mordini may refer to:

 Mordini, a prominent Florentine noble family 
 Mordini (surname), an Italian surname